Kimball High School can refer to:

Kimball High School, now Royal Oak High School, in Royal Oak, Michigan
Justin F. Kimball High School in Dallas, Texas
John C. Kimball High School in Tracy, California